Susanna Vreeland Blume is an American government official who is the Senate–confirmed Director of Cost Assessment and Program Evaluation (CAPE) for the Department of Defense. She began performing the duties of the director of CAPE on January 20, 2021. She was sworn in as the official director on August 5, 2021.

Education 

Raised in Allentown, Pennsylvania, Blume earned a Bachelor of Arts in the history of art from the Johns Hopkins University in 2005. She received a Master of Arts in international studies from the Johns Hopkins University School of Advanced International Studies in 2009 and holds a Juris Doctor from the George Washington University Law School.

Career 

Blume served in the Office of the Under Secretary of Defense for Policy and in the Office of the Deputy Assistant Secretary of Defense for Plans and Posture within the Obama administration. She was a senior fellow and director of the defense program at the Center for a New American Security (CNAS), where her research focused on the alignment of defense strategy, planning, and resources. Prior to joining CNAS, Blume served as deputy chief of staff for programs and plans to the deputy secretary of defense, whom she advised on programming and budget issues, global force management, operational and strategic planning, force posture, and acquisition policy. On January 20, 2021, she was sworn in as acting director of cost assessment and program evaluation.

On April 12, 2021, President Joe Biden announced Blume as his nominee to be the Director of Cost Assessment and Program Evaluation. On April 15, 2021, her nomination was sent to the Senate. Her nomination was reported out of committee on June 10, 2021. She was confirmed by the United States Senate by voice vote on July 30, 2021. She was sworn in as the Director of CAPE on August 5, 2021.

Personal 
Blume is the daughter of Peter Frederick Blume and Karolyn Waller Vreeland. Her father was curator of the Allentown Art Museum from  1974 to 1984 and then director of the museum until February 2002. Her mother was an Allentown attorney. The couple were married in October 1980, but divorced before 2002.

References

External links 

Living people
20th-century American women lawyers
20th-century American lawyers
21st-century American women lawyers
21st-century American lawyers
Year of birth missing (living people)
Place of birth missing (living people)
Biden administration personnel
George Washington University Law School alumni
Johns Hopkins University alumni
Paul H. Nitze School of Advanced International Studies alumni
United States Department of Defense officials